George Porteous  (April 7, 1903 – February 6, 1978) was the 14th Lieutenant Governor of Saskatchewan, Canada from 1976 to 1978.

Early life
George Porteous was born in Douglas, Lanarkshire, Scotland on 7 April 1903. His family emigrated to Canada in 1910 and he attended secondary school in Saskatoon, going on to the University of Saskatchewan, where he was awarded BA in 1927. He began working for the YMCA as  boys’ work secretary in Saskatoon in 1922, later becoming an Army physical education instructor. At the outbreak of World War II he went with the 1st Canadian Division to England as a YMCA Auxiliary Service officer, returning later on to Canada to train others.

War service
In 1941 Porteous was posted with the Winnipeg Grenadiers to Hong Kong, to reinforce the British garrison. The regiment arrived just in time to be overwhelmed by invading Japanese forces, and Porteous was to spend a total of 44 months in one of the notorious prisoner of war camps, where he remained until the end of the war. In due course he was decorated as an MBE, Member of the Order of the British Empire, for his outstanding contribution in maintaining prisoner morale while imprisoned.

Honours
Porteous returned to Saskatoon after the war and was named executive director of the Saskatoon Community Chest. He was later awarded the Order of Canada in 1974 for dedication to community affairs, and was appointed Lieutenant-Governor of Saskatchewan, the Queen’s representative, on 3 March 1976, thus becoming that Province's 14th Lieutenant Governor. He died in office on 6 February 1978.

Medical research
An interesting insight into Porteous' experience is that from 1960 until his death in 1978 Porteous was an enthusiastic advocate of the medical benefits of niacin. Dr. Abram Hoffer had approached him to request that he recommend it to the senior citizens in the social housing development which Porteous administered. Hoffer believed large doses of niacin, up to six grams a day, could retard the development and even reverse senility, as it dilates the blood vessels, thus improving circulation.

Porteous insisted he would not recommend anything to anyone which he had not first tried himself. For six months, he took the six grams a day and then recommended it to the senior citizens without reservation. As he told the Department of Veterans Affairs doctor on his next annual visit (he was on a 100% disability pension) that he had not felt as well since before the war; he could even touch his hands together above his head, not having been able to raise them above his shoulders before the treatment. He discovered that niacin had greatly relieved the severe arthritis and insomnia that had plagued him as a result of his wartime imprisonment and systematic starvation over a four-year period. He supported the use of this vitamin for all Canadian and US ex-prisoners of war suffering from similar symptoms.

Bibliography

References

External links 
 Porteous, George , Encyclopedia of Saskatchewan

1903 births
1978 deaths
Canadian Members of the Order of the British Empire
Canadian prisoners of war in World War II
Lieutenant Governors of Saskatchewan
Members of the Order of Canada
Orthomolecular medicine advocates
World War II prisoners of war held by Japan
Canadian Army personnel of World War II
Military personnel from Lanarkshire
Winnipeg Grenadiers officers
Winnipeg Grenadiers
British emigrants to Canada